The Carrie Furnace Hot Metal Bridge (also known as the Union Railroad Rankin Hot Metal Bridge #35) is a railroad truss bridge across the Monongahela River between Whitaker, Pennsylvania and Rankin, Pennsylvania.  The bridge is out of service and it hasn't seen a train in almost 40 years.

History
The bridge was built to carry freight between Whitaker and the US Steel Carrie Furnace, with the downstream line shielded for the use of hot metal trains. It opened on 31 December 1900 for hot metal traffic and on 14 June 1901 to general traffic.  It is currently owned by the Rivers of Steel National Heritage Area.

In 2016, Allegheny County announced that it would begin assessing the bridge for future use by motor vehicles, cyclists and pedestrians.  Making a direct connection with Pennsylvania Route 837 is one of the goals of the project, which officials hope will relieve backups for automobile traffic entering The Waterfront.  The bridge would also provide cyclists and pedestrians a direct connection from the Carrie Furnace site to the Great Allegheny Passage.

See also
Homestead Steel Works
Carrie Furnace
List of crossings of the Monongahela River

References

Bridges over the Monongahela River
Bridges completed in 1900
Railroad bridges in Pennsylvania
Bridges in Allegheny County, Pennsylvania
1900 establishments in Pennsylvania
U.S. Steel
Steel bridges in the United States